César Ramón Ortega Herrera (16 July 1938 – 8 April 2021) was a Venezuelan Roman Catholic bishop.

Ortega Herrera was born in Venezuela and was ordained to the priesthood in 1963. He served as bishop of the Roman Catholic Diocese of Margarita, Venezuela, from 1983 to 1998 and as bishop of the Roman Catholic Diocese of Barcelona, Venezuela, from 1998 to 2014.

Notes

1938 births
2021 deaths
Venezuelan Roman Catholic bishops
Roman Catholic bishops of Margarita
Roman Catholic bishops of Barcelona in Venezuela